SNET or Snet may refer to:

 Southern New England Telecommunications, former holding company
 SNET America, a long distance telephone company
 SNET Information Services, former directory publisher
 Southern New England Telephone (SNETCo), doing business as Frontier Communications of Connecticut
 SNET, a wireless community network providing internet in Cuba
 Société nationale d'électricité et de thermique, a French electric power company
 Snět, a village in the Czech Republic

See also

 Sportsnet, a Canadian sports specialty channel